Sakaramy is a rural municipality in Madagascar.  It belongs to the district of Antsiranana II, which is a part of Diana Region.  The population of the municipality was estimated to be approximately 3400 in 2012.

It is situated between Antanamitarana and Joffreville.
5 villages belong to this municipality: Sakaramy centre, Mahatsinjo, Ambdimadiro, Sahasifotra and Ankazomibaboka.

Nature
The fish Pachypanchax sakaramyi was described from this locality.

Sports
 Avenir Sakaramy (football)

History
Sakaramy was the terminus of the Decauville railway from Diégo Suarez to Sakaramy, which had been built in 1900–1904.

Until 1975 the French Foreign legion had a camp at Sakaramy.

References

Populated places in Diana Region